Chula Vista Futbol Club is an American soccer club from Chula Vista, California. The club's first team currently competes in the NISA Nation.

History
Chula Vista FC was originally established as a youth soccer organization and added a senior team in 2011. The club's stated goal for the senior team is to provide a bridge between youth and professional soccer for players not in the college soccer system. Notable players that went through the CVFC youth soccer system include Alejandro Guido, Paul Arriola, Joe Corona, Gabriel Farfan and Michael Farfan. CVFC has played against other crosstown teams losing 3-1 in a friendly with North County Battalion and beating their rival Albion SC Pros 3-2. Chula Vista FC aims to eventually have a team for all the United States Soccer Development academy ages and possibly move up to the NASL or USL.

The club gained a measure of national acclaim for its performances in the 2015 Lamar Hunt U.S. Open Cup which included a road win over Arizona United SC, a professional club from the United Soccer League. CVFC was eliminated in the second qualifying round of the 2016 Lamar Hunt U.S. Open Cup in a 4-0 loss against La Máquina FC at home.

On August 25, 2021, the club was announced as a founding member of NISA Nation, a fourth-tier league, for its inaugural 2021 season.

Chula Vista FC II
Chula Vista FC II, CVFC reserve team, currently plays in the SoCal Premier League as part of the SWPL.

Honors
USASA Region IV Open Cup
 Winners: 2015

Cal South Adult State Cup
 Winners: 2018 Open Division
 Runners-up: 2019 Premier Division

2015 Lamar Hunt U.S. Open Cup results

References

External links
 Official website

Association football clubs established in 2011
2011 establishments in California
Sports in Chula Vista, California
Soccer clubs in the Greater San Diego Area